Cha Seung Baek (born May 29, 1980) is a former Korean American professional baseball pitcher.

Baek graduated from Busan High School, Busan, South Korea in 1998. He was signed by the Seattle Mariners as an amateur free agent on September 25, 1998.

Professional career

Seattle Mariners
In his first start he struck out 8 batters over 5.0 innings on July 18.

He was placed on the disabled list on June 2 with a right arm flexor strain. Baek went 5-3 after coming off the DL June 15. At the end of the season he was listed among Baseball America's top-20 Midwest League prospects at the end of the season.

Spent most season on the San Bernardino Stampede's disabled list. He made 2 starts before being placed on the DL from April 13 to May 14 with soreness in his right elbow. He pitched in 3 games, 2 starts in May before suffering a strained right elbow in his final start of the season in May. Placed on the DL again in June through the end of the  season.

Baek missed the entire  season after undergoing right elbow surgery. He participated in the Mariners Fall Instructional League.

He split the  season between the Inland Empire 66ers and the San Antonio Missions. He started the season with Inland Empire appearing in 13 games, 10 starts. From April 19 to the 24 he pitched 10 scoreless innings in two starts. Baek won three consecutive starts from April 19 to the 30. Placed on the disabled list from May 8 to June 10 with a right elbow inflammation. On July 17 he was transferred to San Antonio. He carried a no-hitter into the eighth inning, retiring 21 of the first 22 batters faced, before allowing a single, on July 23.

He made his MLB debut on August 8,  against the Tampa Bay Devil Rays. In the 2004 season, he pitched in seven games (starting five), winning two and losing four, and had a 5.52 ERA overall. He was one of 15 players to make their Major League debuts for Seattle this season.

Baek was non-tendered by the Mariners in December  following a disappointing year in Triple-A with the Tacoma Rainiers. Baek returned to the Rainiers for the  season. He posted an 11–4 record with a 2.80 ERA, which earned him a recall to the Mariners in August 2006, following their trade of Jamie Moyer to the Philadelphia Phillies. After that, he was moved to being a relief pitcher and spot starter for the Mariners.

San Diego Padres

In May , Baek was designated for assignment by the Mariners. Later in the month, he was traded to the San Diego Padres for Jared Wells. Baek hit his first career home run on July 20, 2008, off Jaime Garcia.

On October 8, the Padres released Baek.

Orix Buffaloes
On November 14, 2011, he signed with the Orix Buffaloes. However, he didn't play any games in 2012.

He was released by the Buffaloes on October 5, 2012.

References

External links

1980 births
Arizona League Mariners players
Busan High School alumni
Cardenales de Lara players
South Korean expatriate baseball players in Venezuela
Inland Empire 66ers of San Bernardino players
Lake Elsinore Storm players
Living people
Major League Baseball pitchers
Major League Baseball players from South Korea
South Korean expatriate baseball players in the United States
Nippon Professional Baseball pitchers
Orix Buffaloes players
Orange County Flyers players
Peoria Javelinas players
Portland Beavers players
San Antonio Missions players
San Bernardino Stampede players
San Diego Padres players
Seattle Mariners players
South Korean emigrants to the United States
Sportspeople from Busan
Tacoma Rainiers players
Wisconsin Timber Rattlers players
Yuma Scorpions players